Kristin Rhodes née Danielson is an American strength athlete who is foremost known as the winner of the United Strongmen Women's World Championships competition held in 2012.

Career
Granddaughter of shot putter Bill Nieder and the niece of middle distance runner Tim Danielson, Rhodes had been involved in sports at an early age, playing soccer at Grossmont High School and throwing the hammer, discus, javelin and the shot at San Diego State.

Rhodes started her strongwoman training under the guidance of her husband Donald Allan Rhodes, a California Highway Patrol officer and competitive strongman, and her first competition was in Santa Cruz, California in 2006.

References

American strength athletes
Strongwomen
1975 births
Sportspeople from San Diego
Living people
American sportswomen
21st-century American women